COLI Greenery Villas (中海怡翠山庄 Zhōnghǎi Yícuì Shānzhuāng), also called COLI Greenery (中海怡翠 Zhōnghǎi Yícuì) for short, located at Bulong Road, Buji Sub-district, Longgang District, Shenzhen City, Guangdong Province, People's Republic of China, is a real estate project of China Overseas Real Estate (Shenzhen) Limited. It began to be on sale on July 8, 1997 and was checked in on March 3, 2002.

Feature
Hillside view project with low plot ratio.
With a natural valley - Greenery Valley inside.
Each ground floor unit has private gardens and each garret unit has a roof garden.

Transportation

Bus
 Front gate: COLI Greenery Villas Stop / Station
 Northwest gate: Music Life Garden Stop
 Northeast gate: Sanlian Village Station

Metro
 Shangshuijing Station, Huanzhong Line

News event

Fight for the Rebuilding of Shangshuijing Metro Station
Shangshuijing Metro Station once has been canceled. Residents from COLI Greenery Villas, Music Life Garden & Lakewood Garden showed their counterview to the local government and they finally achieved their goal of rebuilding the metro station.

Neighbourhood
 Shenzhen Metro
 Huanzhong Line
 Shangshuijing Station
 Sanlian Crystal & Jade Culture Village
 Music Life Garden
 Lakehood Garden
 Red Star Macalline Buji Branch
 Bulong Road
 Shuiguan Highway

References

Housing districts in Shenzhen
China Overseas Land and Investment